Lakshadham High School or LHS is a CISCE-affiliated independent, coeducational, English-medium secondary school situated at Gokuldham, Goregaon East, in Mumbai, India.

It was founded in 2007 as an ICSE school with classes from nursery to 10th grade.

See also
 List of schools in Mumbai

References

Private schools in Mumbai
High schools and secondary schools in Mumbai
2007 establishments in Maharashtra
Educational institutions established in 2007